The following is a chronological list of notable sadomasochistic literature about or involving BDSM, both fictional and non-fictional. Both written literature and comics are included, but not films or video. Series are listed as one item; where publication date is ill-defined, the earliest date is used.

17th century 
 1610 Jin Ping Mei
 1639 De Usu Flagrorum
 1693 The Carnal Prayer Mat
 1695 Jin Ping Mei - edited by Zhang Zhupo

18th century 
 1750 Fashionable Lectures
 1785 The 120 Days of Sodom
 1791 Justine
 1795 Aline and Valcour
 1795 Philosophy in the Bedroom
 1797 Juliette

19th century 
 1828 The Lustful Turk
 1830 Exhibition of Female Flagellants
 1866 The Romance of Chastisement
 1870 Venus in Furs
 1873 The Romance of Lust
 1876 The Convent School, or Early Experiences of A Young Flagellant
 1878 Experimental Lecture
 1887 The Whippingham Papers
 1893 Gynecocracy
 1899 The Memoirs of Dolly Morton
 1899 The Torture Garden

20th century 
 1907 Sadopaideia
 1928 Belle de Jour
 1947 Sweet Gwendoline
 1948 Shira
 1954 Nights of Horror
 1956 The Image
 1958 Story of O
 1966 Gor
 1966 Isabella
 1973 Gravity's Rainbow
 1974 Imaginative Sex
 1975 Willard and His Bowling Trophies: A Perverse Mystery
 1978 Nine and a Half Weeks
 1978 Spectator Magazine
 1981 Coming to Power
 1982 Against Sadomasochism
 1983 The Piano Teacher
 1983 The Sleeping Beauty Quartet
 1984 1982, Janine
 1985 Exit to Eden
 1988 Macho Sluts
 1990 Something Leather
 1993 The Ties That Bind
 1994 Skin: Talking About Sex, Class & Literature
 1995 The River Ophelia
 1998 A Defence of Masochism

21st century 
 2001 Kushiel's Legacy series
 2003 Snakes and Earrings
 2004 Terminal Avenue
 2007 L'Étudiante
 2010 The Marketplace series
 2011 Fifty Shades of Grey series
 2011 Sunstone

See also 
 Sadism and masochism in fiction
 BDSM in culture and media

Literature lists